Publius Sittius (died 44 BC) was a Roman equites and mercenary commander. As a mercenary he was employed by king Bocchus II of East-Mauretania. Sittius fought for Bocchus against king Juba I of Numidia, capturing Juba's capital of Cirta and defeating the Numidian army under general Saburra (the victor of the Battle of the Bagradas). He also supported Julius Caesar in the civil war between Caesar and the Optimates, ultimately catching and killing Faustus Cornelius Sulla and Lucius Afranius and destroying Scipio's fleet off Hippo Regius. He was a personal friend of Marcus Tullius Cicero.

Publius Sittius hailed from Nuceria in Campania. His father, also called Publius Sittius, supported Rome during the War of the Allies.

During the Catilinarian Conspiracy Publius Sittius supported Catiline and raised troops to aid Catiline in Mauretania. After Catiline was defeated Sittius sold his Spanish and Italian holdings and remained in Mauretania with his men and became a mercenary.

When the Great Civil War between Caesar and the Optimates started Publius Sittius was still in Mauretania. His mercenary company was in the employ of king Bocchus II of Eastern Mauretania.

Publius Sittius is mentioned in De Bello Africo, the history of the civil war in Africa, seen by a supporter of Caesar (Chs. 25, 36, 48, 93, 95 & 96; the author is unknown).  It is not clear from this text how Sittius came to be in Africa or why he had allied himself with Caesar and not Metellus Scipio. His first recorded action (Ch. 25) in the history joins forces with King Bogus of Mauritanea (or Bocchus II), attacking and forcing the surrender of Cirta, the richest town within the Kingdom of King Juba I, an enemy of Caesar who had already begun to send his army to support Scipio. This event forced King Juba to adjust his plans and return part of his army to defend his territory thereby diminishing Scipio's available manning.

It is recorded that Sittius enjoyed several successes against the enemies of Caesar (Ch. 36), including later the defeat of Juba's forces under Saburra, and the successful ambush of Faustus Cornelius and Lucius Afranius as they attempted to flee to Spain following their defeat by Caesar at Thapsus (Ch. 95). He is also credited with the sinking of Scipio's fleet (Ch. 96) at Hippo Regius where Scipio perished having also taken flight from Caesar after Thapsus. He notably assists Caesar through the campaign by diverting the attention and full strength of King Juba's forces (Ch. 48), preventing him from focusing his resolve entirely on the annihilation of Caesar. 

While it is clear his efforts support Caesar, and he is in the service of Caesar, at no point in the text does it mention that Sittius is commanded by Caesar although it could be expected that communications existed between them or their subordinates. After the end of the campaign Caesar grants him lands at Cirta, within Western Numidia where he founded a colony with his followers the Colonia Cirta Sittianorum cognomine  and settled there. He was killed by Arabio a son of the Numidian king Masinissa II in 44 BC.

References

Ancient Roman soldiers